Ernst Müller (13 July 1901 – 13 September 1958) was a German international footballer.

References

1901 births
Year of death missing
Association football midfielders
German footballers
Germany international footballers
Hertha BSC players